Saccharum spontaneum (wild sugarcane, Kans grass) is a grass native to the Indian Subcontinent. It is a perennial grass, growing up to three meters in height, with spreading rhizomatous roots.

In the Terai-Duar savanna and grasslands, a lowland ecoregion at the base of the Himalaya range in Nepal, India, Bangladesh and Bhutan, kans grass quickly colonises exposed silt plains created each year by the retreating monsoon floods, forming almost pure stands on the lowest portions of the floodplain. Kans grasslands are an important habitat for the Indian rhinoceros (Rhinoceros unicornis). In Nepal, kans grass is harvested to thatch roofs or fence vegetable gardens.

Elsewhere, its ability to quickly colonize disturbed soil has allowed it to become an invasive species that takes over croplands and pasturelands, as has been documented in the Republic of Panama.

Uses
Saccharum spontaneum has a considerable number of regional names in the Indian Subcontinent, for instance kash (কাশ) being common in Bengali, kohuwa (কঁহুৱা) in Assamese, kasatandi (କାଶତଣ୍ଡୀ) in Odia and Kasi (खासि) in Bodo.  It is used in Ayurveda.

This plant has hybridized with Saccharum officinarum, a domesticated sugarcane. The hybridization may have produced Saccharum barberi and Saccharum sinense.

Thanks to a set of species-related orphane genes, Saccharum spontaneum exhibits exceptional resistance to biotic stresses such as nematodes, fungi, bacteria and other pests and diseases, and abiotic stresses such as cold, drought, salinity and nutritionally deficient soil.

See also
 Domesticated plants and animals of Austronesia

References

External links

spontaneum
Flora of the Indian subcontinent
Grasses of India
Flora of Bangladesh
Flora of Bhutan
Flora of Nepal
Plants described in 1771
Taxa named by Carl Linnaeus